Parkia biglobosa, also known as the African locust bean tree or néré tree.

The flower developed into pods, which seeds were used to make Iru (fermented locust beans)

Iru production is still majorly done with traditional sometimes primitive methods.

 Sourcing the Nere (I think the yorubas call it Iyere) seeds, from the farmers or the market,
 Boiling it till soft,
 Pounding the boiled seeds to remove the husks (In some places to remove the husk, the boiled seeds are trampled on with feet in a large bowl or designated area)
Rinsing repeatedly in water with a basket,
 Sorting,

Repeating the boiling process, pounding again till all the husks are removed, rinsing repeatedly and sorting.

Irú (Yoruba) locust beans (English)  or Eware (Edo) is a type of fermented and processed locust beans (Parkia biglobosa) used as a condiment in cooking. It is similar to ogiri and douchi.  It is very popular among the Yoruba people and Edo people of Nigeria. It is used in cooking traditional soups like egusi soup, okro soup (ILA) , Ewedu soup and ogbono soup.
Among the Manding-speaking people of West Africa irú is known as sumbala. The Yorubas classify iru into two types: 

 Irú Wooro This type of Iru is used mostly in vegetable soups like Efo Riro, Egusi soup, Ofada sauce, Ila Asepo e.t.c  .
 Irú pẹ̀tẹ̀ which is used in making ewedu and egusi soup. However it can be used in Efo riro ,  and for people who don’t like seeing whole Iru seeds in their soups. To make Iru Pete, during the boiling process, an extract said to be derived from the Roselle (zobo) plant -Hibiscus sabdariffa- is added, this helps the Iru soften and break down and turns mushy. It is also scooped into a calabash basin and left to ferment for 3 days before salt is added.    
 

This is usually made by molding the fermented locust beans into discs, like a thin patty, the discs are then either sundried or smoked over and open fire.

To use this, you soak in tepid water till the seeds are loose and use. I’ve read that some people toast it slightly over fire to realise the oils before breaking the disc apart to use.

The dried variety is flattened into discs or cakes for sale. Dried iru is weaker in flavor and pungency than fresh (though frying dried iru in cooking oil will restore much of the flavor). The dried variety stores very well in freezers.

The most valuable part of the locust beans are high in lipid (29%), protein (35%), and carbohydrate (16%). It is a good source of calcium and fat for rural dwellers.

During fermentation, the reducing sugar content increases, and the total free amino acid content initially decreases; in the end, however, there is a large increase in free amino acid content.

Also increasingly popular is powdered Iru. This is derived by blending dried fermented locust beans into powder. The ingenuity of this is that people who don’t like seeing whole Iru in their meal, but want the richness of the flavour of iru, can conveniently add it to their meals. Powdered Iru is also easier to store and send as gift especially to  friends. 

In an airtight container this would last several weeks to months at room temperature and would keep even longer in a fridge or freezer. Both the fruits, seeds, leaves, nuts, pods and essential oils of the African locust beans are highly valuable.

Benefits of IRU. 

 Anti-oxidant properties.
 Wound Healing properties.
 Treatment of hypertension and boosts the immune system
 Dermatologist properties.
 Treatment of respiratory infections.
 Treatment of gastrointestinal disorder. 
 Improve digestion. 
 Reduce cholesterol.

See also 
 List of African dishes
 Sumbala

References

Fermented foods
Condiments
Nigerian cuisine
Yoruba cuisine
Umami enhancers